The Mayflower Inn on Manomet Point, Plymouth Massachusetts was a large wooden structure set atop a hill off Point Road, with sweeping vistas of White Horse Beach to the north and the Cape Cod Bay and Scooks Pond to the south. Its exterior is similar in design to the Chatham Bars Inn, located in Chatham Massachusetts, which opened in 1914.

The Mayflower Inn opened in June 1917. "This ambitious 170-room (including outbuildings) Colonial Revival-style structure was designed by Boston architect J. Williams Beal ...," Bryant Tolles wrote in Summer By the Seaside: The Architecture of New England Coastal Resort Hotels. It included "a low, 260-foot-long three-story gambrel-roof edifice, highlighted by its expansive shed-roof dormers, paired front gambrel bays, and extended veranda with balustrades."

This inn was a summer resort for wealthy Americans, New England Governors Conventions and politicians.

The inn was built near the historic Ardmore Inn, formerly the Manomet House, founded in the 18th century and run for generations by members of the Holmes family. "When the Mayflower Hotel was built in 1917, the Ardmore Inn was used to house the help and personnel. When I was a child, it was used for this purpose and through the years, lapsed into a state of disrepair," Muriel Holmes Anderson Weeks wrote in A Family History in 1975. The Ardmore was demolished in the 1960s, despite local efforts to preserve it.

In its heyday the Mayflower Inn, "attracted a New York clientele and dominated life along the shoreline in 1950s," according to The Old Colony Memorial newspaper.

The structure was significantly damaged by sequential fires in the 1970s. It was eventually demolished and replaced by a condominium complex.

References

External links
1927 postcard
undated postcard..

Hotels in Massachusetts
Buildings and structures in Plymouth, Massachusetts
Hotels established in 1917
Demolished buildings and structures in Massachusetts